The Second Ichirō Hatoyama Cabinet is the 53rd Cabinet of Japan headed by Ichirō Hatoyama from March 19 to November 22, 1955.

Cabinet

References 

Cabinet of Japan
1955 establishments in Japan
Cabinets established in 1955
Cabinets disestablished in 1955